Talalpsee or Talsee is a lake at an elevation of 1086 m above Filzbach in the Canton of Glarus, Switzerland.

Talalp
Lakes of the canton of Glarus